CTV Classic, formerly known as CTV MyLife, is a digital television channel operated by China Television (CTV) in Taiwan.

See also
 Media of Taiwan

Television stations in Taiwan
Television channels and stations established in 2004
2004 establishments in Taiwan